Kenneth Wilson (born May 1, 1954) is an American politician. He is a member of the Missouri House of Representatives, having served since 2013. He is a member of the Republican Party.

References

Living people
Republican Party members of the Missouri House of Representatives
1954 births
21st-century American politicians
People from Smithville, Missouri